Chombu is a mountain peak located at  in north of Sikkim, India.

Location 
The peak is located in a relatively isolated part of North Sikkim, along the path that leads to the Thangu-Yumesandong pass.

Climbing history 
There are no documented ascents of Chombu. Also, due to its proximity to the Tibetan border, climbing on it is strictly controlled.

Attempts 
In 2019 and 2022, two mountaineers from London made three attempts to climb the summit, but they were unsuccessful. The peak is still unconquered.

References 

Mountains of Sikkim
Six-thousanders of the Transhimalayas